In automotive design, a class A surface is any of a set of freeform surfaces of high efficiency and quality. Although, strictly, it is nothing more than saying the surfaces have curvature and tangency alignment – to ideal aesthetical reflection quality, many people interpret class A surfaces to have G2 (or even G3) curvature continuity to one another (see free form surface modelling).

Class A surfacing is done using computer-aided industrial design applications. Class A surface modellers are also called "digital sculptors" in the industry. Industrial designers develop their design styling through the A-Surface, the physical surface the end user can feel, touch, see etc.

Application

A common method of working is to start with a prototype model and produce smooth mathematical Class A surfaces to describe the product's outer body. From this the production of tools and inspection of finished parts can be carried out. Class A surfacing complements the prototype modelling stage by reducing time and increasing control over design iterations.

Class A surfaces can be defined as any surface, that has styling intent, that is either seen, touched, or both and mathematically meets the definition for Bézier.

Automotive design application

In automotive design application Class A surfaces are created on all visible exterior surfaces (ex; body panels, bumper, grill, lights etc.) and all visible surfaces of see-touch & feel parts in interior (ex: Dashboard, seats, door pads etc.). This can also include beauty covers in the engine compartment, mud flaps, trunk panels and carpeting.

Product design application

In the product design realm, Class A surfacing can be applied to such things like housing for industrial appliances that are injection moulded, home appliances, highly aesthetic  plastic packaging defined by highly organic surfaces, toys or furniture. Among the most famous users of Autodesk Alias software in product design is Apple.

Aerospace design application

Aerospace has styling and product design considerations in interiors like bezels for air vents and lights, interior roof storage racks, seats and cockpit area etc. In recent years Airbus used ICEM Surf for generating the exterior surface geometry for Aesthetics and Aerodynamic optimisation before delivering the surface to downstream CAD software like CATIA.

Clay modelling
Class A surfacing / digital sculpting is similar to clay modelling with the added advantage of computing power to change or incorporate design changes in existing/new design. Moreover, the revisions of clay modelling and refinement iteration are carried out in digital version. The scanned data of a selected clay model will be taken as a "Point cloud data" input, and Class A designers work on this Point cloud data to generate preliminary surfaces and further refine them to Class A surfaces.

Notable software
Class A surfacing is also called "digital sculpting" with numerous software tools now available in the automotive industry. The most widely used software tools are Alias by Autodesk, ICEM Surf followed by Imageware and Unigraphics (Class-A Module) and Catia (FreeStyle Module) by Dassault systems etc and Tebis Cad/Cam.

References 

Vehicle design
Computer-aided design software
Computer-aided industrial design
Computer-aided design
3D computer graphics
Surfaces
Graphic design